The Kalabugao River is a river located in the municipality of Impasugong in Bukidnon province in the Philippines. It is a tributary of the Pulangi River.

Rivers of the Philippines
Landforms of Bukidnon